Bang Boom Bang – A Sure Thing is a German comedy film from 1999. The movie is set in Unna, Westphalia. It was filmed in Unna as well as in Dortmund.

Plot
The part-time criminal Keek has lost most of the money from a bank robbery that he committed together with the now jailed Karl-Heinz "Kalle" Grabowski.

When Kalle watches a porn-movie in jail, shot by Keek's friend Franky, he sees his wife Manuela starring in the movie, Kalle goes crazy and escapes from prison. Before killing Franky, the escaped Kalle unexpectedly appears at Keek's door and demands his money.

The next day, the alcoholic "Schlucke" is forced by his boss Werner Kampmann, to break into his transport company to pretend a burglary because of insurance fraud. Schlucke, however, has talked boastfully about his plan, so that Keek sees a chance to get the money for Kalle. Together with his friend Andy, Schlucke and Ratte (another fellow criminal) break into the company. Because Keek has his Thumb ripped off and locked in the safe during the safecracking attempt, Keek and Andy pull the safe out by tying it to a chain attached to Keek's car, leading to an iconic picture from a speeding camera.

The following day, Keek and Andy try to blackmail Kampmann with documents from his safe. At the airport, while trying to fetch the money, Keek and Andy meet both Kampmann and Kalle. Suddenly, Kampmann is being shot by Kalle, who is killed by a plainclothes-policeman afterwards.
As it turns out later, the stolen money was already taken away by a former apprentice of Kampmann, Melanie, who moved to Mallorca with a friend in the meantime.

Cast

Production
The film was shot in Unna, Cologne and Dortmund and Dortmund Airport, which is located at city boundary of Dortmund. The budget was valued at about 5 million Deutsche Mark.

Awards
Peter Thorwarth received the "Director’s Promotional Award" at the 1999 "Filmfest München". In 2000, the film was honoured with "VGF Award" at the Bavarian Film Awards.

References

External links

1999 films
German crime comedy films
1990s German-language films
Films shot in Cologne
1990s crime comedy films
Films set in Germany
1999 comedy films
1990s German films